Samuel Buck (1696 – 17 August 1779) and his brother Nathaniel Buck (died  1759/1774) were English  engravers and printmakers, best known for their Buck's Antiquities, depictions of ancient castles and monasteries. Samuel produced much work on his own but when the brothers worked together, they were usually known as the Buck Brothers.  More is known about Samuel than Nathaniel.

Careers 
Samuel Buck was born in Yorkshire in 1696.  After publishing some prints in that county he moved to London.  With Nathaniel he embarked on making a number of series of prints of "antiquities", which consisted of ancient castles and former religious buildings in England and Wales.  Starting in 1724, they travelled around these countries, and completed sets of prints for the regions of England by 1738 and for Wales between 1739 and 1742.  These are commonly known as Buck's Antiquities.  During this time they also worked on a series of townscapes in England and Wales entitled Cities, Sea-ports and Capital Towns.

Deaths and burials 
Nathaniel was the first to die, sometime between 1759 and 1774.  Samuel died on 17 August 1779 in London and was buried in the churchyard of St. Clement Danes. Samuel's later years were spent in poverty.

References

Further reading
"The brothers Buck", Alice Rylance-Watson, British Library 

English engravers
English printmakers
Sibling duos
People from Richmond, North Yorkshire